Life's Too Good is the debut studio album by Icelandic alternative rock group the Sugarcubes. It was released in April 1988 by One Little Indian in the UK and Europe and in May 1988 by Elektra Records in the US. The album was an unexpected success and brought international attention for the band, especially to lead singer Björk, who would launch a successful solo career in 1993.

Consisting of veterans of Reykjavík's early 1980s rock culture, the band took elements of the post-punk sound that characterised the scene, intending to create a humorous take on pop music's optimism, which is reflected in the album's title. Despite never having intended to be taken seriously, and because of the success of their debut and their contractual obligations, the Sugarcubes went on to release two further studio albums.

Release
The lead single "Birthday" was released on Derek Birkett's One Little Indian Records in August 1987. After influential magazine NME declared it "Single of the Week", the Sugarcubes, especially lead singer Björk, unexpectedly got the attention of the British music press. Across the following months, the band reluctantly appeared on the covers of the United Kingdom's most prominent pop magazines and experienced "massive hype" which generated a wave of interest from the press and the public. Despite offers by major labels like Warner Bros. and PolyGram, none of these labels were willing to give the Sugarcubes complete creative control, so the band decided to record the album themselves and release it on One Little Indian. Life's Too Good was finally released in April 1988. "Coldsweat" and "Deus" were issued as singles prior to the album's release in January and April 1988 respectively, while the Jesus and Mary Chain's remix of "Birthday" (subtitled the "Christmas Mix") was released as a single in August 1988. "Motorcrash" followed as the album's final single in November 1988.

While recording Life's Too Good, the Sugarcubes had befriended Howard Thompson, who worked in Elektra Records' A&R division; he orchestrated a licensing deal and the album was released in the United States. "Birthday" proved to be very successful on American college radio, before crossing over to mainstream radio. To the band's frustration, the American media also focused on Björk. At the end of 1988, the Sugarcubes undertook an American tour, which evolved into an international tour catapulted by the album's growing sales.

Paul White of Me Company designed the artwork for Life's Too Good. The figures depicted in the artwork are derivations of a signature he had which consisted of a character "made up of just a face, legs and a [penis]." White stuck to using flat-color backgrounds; this discipline was born out of the need to keep printing costs as low as possible, and had previously been followed for the sleeve designs of the "Birthday" and "Coldsweat" singles. The album was issued in various color schemes, including green, yellow, blue and pink.

Critical reception

Life's Too Good was released to largely positive reviews, receiving acclaim from the British and American press. In his review for NME, Steven Wells gave the album an unconventional score of fifty out of ten, awarding ten points each for "cheekiness", "naughtiness", "sexiness", "silliness" and "scariness". Nancy Culp of Record Mirror said that while the Sugarcubes' music is not particularly innovative, "their approach is fresh and their energy indisputable." Los Angeles Times critic Robert Hilburn commented that "Life's Too Good has the feel of an impact album: one of those rare debuts—like the first X or Talking Heads albums—that not only influence the creative underground but stretch the overall boundaries of rock." John Dougan praised Björk's vocals and the album's "strong" songs in a retrospective review for AllMusic, and considered that the album "lived up to all the advance hype."

Less impressed was Robert Christgau from The Village Voice, who wrote that the band's "sense of mischief isn't just playful—it's experimental and a little wicked. It's also so imperfectly realized that you have to infer it out from underneath their breathy swoops, willful shifts and starts, and translated lyrics—so imperfectly realized that most of their fans, critics included, barely notice it."

Legacy
Life's Too Good is credited as the first Icelandic album "of its breed" to have a worldwide impact. In 2014, Treble wrote that the album "[generated] a larger interest towards the country’s popular and alternative music scenes alike." The album is considered a definite influence on all subsequent Icelandic popular music, and on international acts such as Savages and Florence and the Machine. Since its release, Life's Too Good has generated a dedicated following, and is nowadays cited as an important cult classic. The album helped in regarding the Sugarcubes as "the biggest rock band to emerge from Iceland." "Coldsweeat" was covered by the industrial rock band Diatribe on the 1993 album Shut Up Kitty: A Cyber-Based Covers Compilation.

Accolades
The information regarding accolades attributed to Life's Too Good is adapted from Acclaimed Music, except where otherwise noted.

Track listing

Personnel
Credits adapted from the liner notes of Life's Too Good.

The Sugarcubes
Bragi Ólafsson – bass
Sigtryggur Baldursson – drums
Þór Eldon – guitar
Björk Guðmundsdóttir – vocals, keyboard
Einar Örn Benediktsson – vocals, trumpet

Additional personnel
Engineering – Brian Pugsley, Gail Lambourne, Gerard Johnson, Ken Thomas, Kjartan Kjartansson, Mel Jefferson 
Production – Derek Birkett and Ray Shulman
Sleeve – Paul White
Copyright – One Little Indian Records
Publishing – Second Wind
Design – Me Company
Distribution – The Cartel

Charts

Sales

References

External links

 
  statistics, tagging and previews at Last.fm
 Life's Too Good at Rate Your Music

The Sugarcubes albums
1988 debut albums
Elektra Records albums
Albums recorded at Berry Street Studio